A M Nurul Islam (1939–2017), also known as Nurul Islam Anu, was a Bangladeshi politician and bureaucrat. He started his career in the erstwhile Civil Services of Pakistan (CSP) in 1963 and joined the Government of Bangladesh after independence in 1971. He was the private secretary to former Prime Minister of Bangladesh Sheikh Mujibur Rahman (1972 to 1973). He has been the longest serving president of the US chapter of Bangladesh Awami League (1989-2002).

Early life 
A M Nurul Islam (Anu) was born on December 14, 1939 in Courtgaon of Munshiganj District, Dhaka Division, Bangladesh. His father was Sirajul Islam and mother was Edanessa Begum. He is the elder brother of A J M Enamul Islam,  the Secretary General of the Commonwealth Society of Bangladesh; also an established Bangladeshi businessman. He is the younger brother of Firoza Begum and Hosneara Chowdhury, former director of the Department of Social Services. Anu is the nephew of Abdul Hakim Bikrampuri, former member of the undivided Bengal Legislative Assembly and Pakistan Provisional and National Assembly.   

He received MA in history from University of Dhaka in 1961, and worked as a lecturer in the university till joining the Civil Services of Pakistan in 1963.  

His wife, Mohsina Islam, gave birth to their first son, Mohammed Fares, in 1965. Their second son, Mohammed Riad, was born in 1969.

Career

Civil service

A M Nurul Islam (Anu) worked in various capacities of the District and Civil Administration under the governments of Pakistan (1963-1971) and Bangladesh (1972-1975). During Bangladesh's liberation war in 1971, despite being under the then East Pakistan government, he played pivotal role from within the administration helping the exiled Mujibnagar government. He was given the assignment to bring Bangabhaban to order after the surrender of the Pakistan army on December 16, 1971; fix the damaged infrastructure and mobilize Bangabhaban's staff before the arrival of the exiled leaders of the first government of Bangladesh from Mujibnagar. Following, the installation of the first government of the People's Republic of Bangladesh, Anu was inducted in the administration as the joint secretary to President Abu Sayeed Chowdhury, in 1972. Soon, he got transferred to the Prime Minister's Office and appointed as the private secretary to Prime Minister Sheikh Mujibur Rahman (1972-1973). In 1973, Anu was attached to the Ministry of Foreign Affairs, and assigned in the High Commission of Bangladesh in Washington D.C. as its Economic and Trade Counselor.

Islam continued his career as a diplomat till August 15, 1975 when he resigned in protest of the assassination of President Sheikh Mujibur Rahman and declined to join the following governments of Khondaker Mostaq Ahmad and Ziaur Rahman.   

For his outstanding contributions, in shaping up the civil administration of Bangladesh, Anu was awarded the Mother Teresa Gold Medal in 2010 by the Mother Teresa Research Council.

Politics
Being, a career civil servant, Islam was not affiliated with any political party until his resignation from government service in 1975. Following, his resignation as a diplomat, he joined the Bangladesh Awami League and was instrumental in the formation of the party's US chapter (US Awami League) in 1982. In 1989, Islam was elected the president of the US Awami League, in the presence of the president of the Bangladesh Awami League, Sheikh Hasina, and went on to become the longest serving president of the party's unit in North America (1989-2002). 

Anu was an influential member of the Awami League’s election coordination team for the 1991 and 1996 parliamentary elections.

Private sector and print media

Following, Islam's resignation from the High Commission of Bangladesh, Anu entered the field of business, and settled in Maryland, USA. He established an international commodity trading and consulting company, Transcontinental IMEX Plc., and was the president of the company for more than 20 years. Anu moved back to Bangladesh from the United States of America in 2004 and got involved in the country's banking sector. He was the director of National Bank Limited, a private commercial bank from 2005 to 2008 and was in charge of the bank's audit committee from 2007 to 2008.

In 2008, Islam joined another private commercial bank, Bank Asia Limited, as its director. In 2009, he became the bank's vice chairman, and remained in the position till his death on October 18, 2017. During the time, he headed the bank's Audit and Risk Management Committees in various phases. In 2013, Anu joined the Opex Group, one of Bangladesh's leading ready-made garment exporting companies as its financial advisor and remained there till the time of his death.

From 2009 to 2013, Islam was the editor and, later publisher, of the Bengali newspaper, the Daily Shokaler Khobor (Bengali: দৈনিক সকালের খবর). He was also a columnist for The Daily Star, writing political commentaries in the country's most circulated English newspaper.

Death 
Islam died on October 18, 2017. President of Bangladesh Abdul Hamid and Prime Minister Sheikh Hasina issued separate condolence messages remembering the contributions of Islam.

The US Awami League, in New York, and its affiliated organizations, across North America, organized prayer and memorial services in honor of Nurul Islam Anu.

References

1939 births
2017 deaths
People from Munshiganj District
Awami League politicians
Bangladeshi expatriates in the United States
Bangladeshi bankers